André Filipe Carneiro Leal (born 6 August 1995), known as Andrezinho, is a Portuguese professional footballer who plays for C.D. Trofense as a midfielder.

Club career
Born in Barcelos, Braga District, Andrezinho finished his youth career at F.C. Paços de Ferreira. He made his Primeira Liga debut for the club on 26 April 2015, playing 75 minutes in the 3–1 away win against F.C. Arouca; it was one of just five appearances during the season.

Andrezinho scored his first goal in the top division on 12 December 2015, in a 6–0 home rout of C.F. União. He played 15 matches (only two as a starter) during the 2017–18 campaign, which ended in relegation to the LigaPro.

On 11 January 2019, Andrezinho signed a one-and-a-half-year contract with second-tier side G.D. Estoril Praia. In August, however, he moved to FK Spartak Subotica of the Serbian SuperLiga on a two-year deal.

References

External links

Portuguese League profile 

1995 births
Living people
People from Barcelos, Portugal
Sportspeople from Braga District
Portuguese footballers
Association football midfielders
Primeira Liga players
Liga Portugal 2 players
Campeonato de Portugal (league) players
F.C. Paços de Ferreira players
G.D. Estoril Praia players
U.D. Leiria players
C.D. Trofense players
Serbian SuperLiga players
FK Spartak Subotica players
Portuguese expatriate footballers
Expatriate footballers in Serbia
Portuguese expatriate sportspeople in Serbia